Sacramento History Museum is the only museum devoted to Sacramento, California and California Gold Rush history.  It is located at 101 I Street in Old Sacramento.  Just west of the museum is the Sacramento River and both the Tower Bridge and the I Street Bridge are visible from the museum.

The building itself is a replica of Sacramento's 1854 City Hall and Waterworks building, showcased in natural brick with two stories of 14-foot double doors across the front.

Exhibit themes include the Gold Rush and mining, Nisenan & Maidu Indian Nations, fur trapping, agriculture, and cultural heritage.

Museum history
The museum originally opened in 1985 as the Sacramento History Center, to exhibit artifacts and records from the Sacramento Archives and Museum Collection Center. In 1993, in a collaborative effort with the City of Sacramento, the Sacramento History Center, and the Sacramento Science Center, the Sacramento Museum of History, Science, and Technology was formed.  The Sacramento Museum of History, Science, and Technology operated both museum sites under the name "Discovery Museum."  The Old Sacramento location remained dedicated to the history of Sacramento and the California Gold Rush, and was renamed the "Discovery Museum Gold Rush History Center."
 Who Is She...
In July 2008, under a directive from the City of Sacramento, the alliance between the History Center and the Science Center was dissolved.  The Discovery Museum Science and Space Center continues to operate independently of the Sacramento History Museum.

The Sacramento History Alliance assumed administration of the Sacramento History Museum and continues to educate visitors about Sacramento and the role the city has played in the state from the time of the Gold Rush.

City history
The history of Sacramento is a fascinating story that dates to prehistory times with Native American settlements.  John Sutter arrived in 1839 and founded the first permanent settlement in the area.  After gold was discovered in nearby Coloma in 1848, businesses sprang up along the riverfront in what is now Old Sacramento.  There were hotels, saloons, bathhouses, and a variety of shops where would-be miners could outfit themselves for the gold fields.

A gold trade center in the 1860s, Old Sacramento has been redeveloped with cobblestone streets, gas lamps, and wooden sidewalks. More than 200 shops and restaurants are housed in Gold Rush-era structures, including a firehouse built in 1853, California’s first theater, and a replica of the city’s first waterworks building. Of special interest is the B.F. Hastings Building, built in 1853, served as the terminus for the Pony Express and the chambers of the first California Supreme Court. In 1965 Old Sacramento became California Historical Landmark #812.

In the 1860s Sacramento raised its streets to avoid devastating floods.  Sacramento is the only city in California to do so and was one of the first in the nation.  The Sacramento History Alliance and the Sacramento History Museum conduct tours of "Old Sacramento Underground" where visitors can get a first-hand look at the incredible undertaking.

External links
Historic Old Sacramento Foundation - official museum website
Center for Sacramento History - official website

History of Sacramento, California
California State Historic Parks
California Historical Landmarks
Museums in Sacramento, California
History museums in California
Sacramento, California